A Nine O'Clock Town is a 1918 American comedy silent film written and directed by Victor Schertzinger. The film stars Charles Ray, Jane Novak, Otto Hoffman, Gertrude Claire, Catherine Young, and Dorcas Matthews. The film was released on July 28, 1918, by Paramount Pictures. It is not known whether the film currently survives, and it may be a lost film.

Plot
As described in a film magazine, David Clary has big ideas on how to run a store, but John Clary, his crusty old dad, lets his business run downhill. David goes to the big city and while working as a clerk in a department store absorbs a few more pointers. He is also fleeced by a cabaret habitué (Young). Finally, his father sends for him to rejuvenate the "Emporium." By employing the town band and advertising, he fills the store with customers. The cabaret girl comes to town on the pretext of returning his watch and lures him to her hotel room. Here her fake husband (Ross) blackmails the young manager, but is exposed when he comes to collect $5000 from David by the corset model (Matthews), who swears that he is her husband. Selling out the store to a syndicate for a large sum saves David from bankruptcy and he takes his chief clerk and constant adviser Katherine Farrell (Novak) as his life partner.

Cast
Charles Ray as David Clary
Jane Novak as Katherine Farrell
Otto Hoffman as John Clary
Gertrude Claire as	Mrs. Clary
Catherine Young as The Dame
Dorcas Matthews as The Model
Milton Ross as The Dame's Partner
Melbourne MacDowell as Mr. Adler
Caroline Rankin as Saleslady (credited as Caroline 'Spike' Rankin)

References

External links 
 

1918 films
1910s English-language films
Silent American comedy films
1918 comedy films
Paramount Pictures films
Films directed by Victor Schertzinger
American black-and-white films
American silent feature films
1910s American films